Germán Pablo Castillo (born 19 October 1977 in El Trébol) is an Argentine footballer who plays for Cerro Porteño in Paraguay.

External links
 
 Argentine Primera statistics
 Interview at Radio-mundial.com 

1977 births
Living people
Argentine footballers
People from San Martín Department, Santa Fe
Association football midfielders
Argentine Primera División players
Paraguayan Primera División players
Ecuadorian Serie A players
Club de Gimnasia y Esgrima La Plata footballers
Unión de Santa Fe footballers
Club Atlético Lanús footballers
C.D. Cuenca footballers
Club Atlético Huracán footballers
Cerro Porteño players
Expatriate footballers in Paraguay
Expatriate footballers in Ecuador
Sportspeople from Santa Fe Province